Julian Aleksandrowicz (1908 Kraków –1988 Kraków) was a Polish medical professional, professor of medicine, and a notable specialist on leukemia. He is known for having developed concepts of comprehensive psychotherapy of persons suffering from somatic diseases, as well as of the ecological prevention of cancer and leukaemia.

Aleksandrowicz was of Jewish descent, and after German invasion of Poland (during which he fought in the 72nd Infantry Regiment), he was imprisoned in the Kraków Ghetto (he managed to bury his research data beforehand and recover them after the war). He founded one of the three ghetto hospitals. While in the ghetto, he was aided by one of the Polish Righteous, Józef Adamowicz (who was eventually caught and beaten to death by Nazi guards at the ghetto). Later, in 1943, Aleksandrowicz managed to escape the ghetto and became a physician of the Polish resistance, Armia Krajowa in the Kielce-Radom Independent Jodła Region, under a nom-de-guerre Doktor Twardy. Eventually he became a platoon leader. For his participation in the resistance, he received the Silver Cross of the Virtuti Militari.

For most of his life, he lived in Kraków. He was an author of many medical texts (including the first Polish textbook on hematology), and a professor (since 1951) and a director of the notable Hematology Clinic at the Jagiellonian university medical college (1950–1978).

Awards and decorations
 Silver Cross of the Virtuti Militari
 Commander's Cross of the Order of Polonia Restituta
 Cross of Merit with Swords
 Cross of Valour

Notes

External links
 Halina Kleszcz, Profesor Julian Aleksandrowicz, uznany krakowianinem XX wieku w dziedzinie nauki, już 15 lat nie inspiruje świata medycyny
 Aleksander B. Skotnicki, Droga życiowa profesora Juliana Aleksandrowicza / Profesor Julian Aleksandrowicz (1908–1988) (mirror)

1908 births
1988 deaths
Physicians from Kraków
Academic staff of Jagiellonian University
Home Army members
Polish hematologists
Kraków Ghetto inmates
Recipients of the Silver Cross of the Virtuti Militari
Recipients of the Cross of Merit with Swords (Poland)
Recipients of the Cross of Valour (Poland)
Commanders of the Order of Polonia Restituta
20th-century Polish Jews
Jewish anti-fascists